This article contains a list of current SNCF railway stations in the Centre-Val de Loire region of France.

Cher (18)

 Avord
 Bengy
 Bigny
 Bourges
 Châteauneuf-sur-Cher
 Foëcy
 La Guerche-sur-l'Aubois
 Lunery
 Marmagne
 Mehun-sur-Yèvre
 Nérondes
 Saint-Amand-Montrond-Orval
 Saint-Florent-sur-Cher
 Saint-Germain-du-Puy
 Urçay
 Vierzon-Forges
 Vierzon-Ville

Eure-et-Loir (28)

 Amilly-Ouerray
 Arrou
 Auneau
 Bailleau-le-Pin
 Bonneval
 Brou
 Chartres
 Châteaudun
 Château-Gaillard
 Cloyes
 Courtalain-Saint-Pellerin
 Courville-sur-Eure
 Dreux
 Épernon
 Illiers-Combray
 Jouy
 La Loupe
 Lucé
 Magny-Blandainville
 Maintenon
 Marchezais-Broué
 Nogent-le-Rotrou
 Pontgouin
 Saint-Aubin-Saint-Luperce
 Saint-Piat
 La Taye
 Toury
 La Villette-Saint-Prest
 Voves

Indre (36)

 Argenton-sur-Creuse
 Chabenet
 Chabris
 Châteauroux
 Éguzon
 La Gauterie
 Issoudun
 Lothiers
 Luant
 Luçay-le-Mâle
 Neuvy-Pailloux
 Reuilly
 Sainte-Lizaigne
 Valençay
 Varennes-sur-Fouzon

Indre-et-Loire (37)

 Amboise
 Azay-le-Rideau
 Azay-sur-Cher
 Ballan
 Bleré-La Croix
 Chambourg
 La Chapelle-sur-Loire
 Château-Renault
 Chenonceaux
 Chinon
 Cinq-Mars-la-Pile
 Cormery
 Courçay-Tauxigny
 La Douzillère
 Druye
 Esvres
 Joué-lès-Tours
 Langeais
 Limeray
 Loches
 Maillé
 La Membrolle-sur-Choisille
 Mettray
 Monnaie
 Montbazon
 Montlouis
 Monts
 Neuillé-Pont-Pierre
 Noizay
 Notre-Dame-d'Oé
 Port-Boulet
 Port-de-Piles
 Reignac
 Rivarennes
 Saint-Antoine-du-Rocher
 Sainte-Maure-Noyant
 Saint-Genouph
 Saint-Martin-le-Beau
 Saint-Paterne
 Saint-Patrice
 Saint-Pierre-des-Corps
 Savonnières
 Tours
 Veigné
 Véretz-Montlouis
 Villeperdue

Loiret (45)

 Artenay
 Les Aubrais
 Baule
 Beaugency
 Boisseaux
 Briare
 Cercottes
 Chaingy-Fourneaux-Plage
 La Chapelle-Saint-Mesmin
 Chevilly
 Dordives
 Ferrières–Fontenay
 La Ferté-Saint-Aubin
 Gien
 Malesherbes
 Meung-sur-Loire
 Montargis
 Nogent-sur-Vernisson
 Orléans
 Saint-Ay
 Saint-Cyr-en-Val

Loir-et-Cher (41)

 Blois
 La Chaussée-Saint-Victor
 Chissay-en-Touraine
 Chouzy-sur-Cisse
 Faubourg-d'Orléans
 La Ferté-Imbault
 Fréteval-Morée
 Gièvres
 Lamotte-Beuvron
 Loreux
 Menars
 Mennetou-sur-Cher
 Mer
 Montrichard
 Nouan-le-Fuzelier
 Onzain
 Pezou
 Pruniers
 Les Quatre-Roues
 Romorantin-Blanc-Argent
 Saint-Aignan-Noyers
 Saint-Amand-de-Vendôme
 Salbris
 Selles-Saint-Denis
 Selles-sur-Cher
 Suèvres
 Theillay
 Thésée
 Vendôme
 Vendôme-Villiers-sur-Loir
 Veuves-Monteaux
 Villefranche-sur-Cher
 Villeherviers

See also
 SNCF 
 List of SNCF stations for SNCF stations in other regions

Centre